The following is the discography of Soulfly, an American metal band formed in 1997 by Max Cavalera after leaving Sepultura. The band's original lyrical content revolved around spirituality, political and religious themes, with later albums encompassing other themes including war, violence, aggression, slavery, hatred and anger. Soulfly incorporates many styles of metal with Brazilian tribal and world music. All of their first six studio albums debuted on the United States Billboard 200, with a peak position at number 32 for their second album, Primitive. Soulfly has been certified gold by the Recording Industry Association of America. The band has gone through numerous line-up changes, with Cavalera being the only constant member. To date the band has released twelve studio albums, one tour EP, twenty-six singles, one video album, and twelve music videos. Their debut album, Soulfly, was released on April 21, 1998, while their newest album, Totem, was released on August 5, 2022.

Albums

Studio albums

Live albums

Compilation albums

Video albums

EPs

Singles

Music videos

References 

Heavy metal group discographies
Discography
Discographies of American artists